Stefano Macaluso (born 6 September 1975 in Casale Monferrato, Italy) is an Italian businessman.
He attended high school and went to university in Turin, graduating with a degree in Architecture from the Politecnico in 2002.
While completing his university course, he also devoted some time to his passion of motor sports, competing first in Italian Championship rallies before going on to the European and World Championships.

Career
Since his earliest age, Stefano Macaluso had been immersed in the world of watches: he has seen his father Luigi Macaluso at work as President of the Sowind Group that incorporates a "Manufacture" and the two watchmaking brands Girard-Perregaux and JeanRichard. Surrounded by the technical and aesthetic expertise that has made the luxury Swiss watch-making industry so famous, he has acquired wide experience in this sector to add to his extensive professional know-how.

Since 2003 he has lived in La Chaux-de-Fonds in the Swiss canton of Neuchâtel. There, he has successively held professional positions in strategy marketing, product creation and development, industrial management and in the Sales Department Direction for Girard-Perregaux. Among his achievements, he has coordinated the development of the Girard-Perregaux retail concept, from the first flagship store open in Gstaad in 2004 to the newest boutiques opened in New York and China. Passionate for design, he puts his architect background to good use through his involvement in the product creation.

Since November 2010, Stefano Macaluso has been appointed general manager for Girard-Perregaux.

See also
Girard-Perregaux
Sowind Group
World Championship Motorsports

References

External links
 http://www.girard-perregaux.com Website of Girard-Perregaux
 http://www.jeanrichard.com Website of Jeanrichard
 http://www.worldtempus.com Website of Worldtempus
 http://www.europastar.com

Further reading
ArmbandUhren, Special Girard-Perregaux, Peter Braun, 2007, 
Worldtempus, www.worldtempus.com
Sowind Group press release nov.2010

1975 births
Businesspeople from Turin
Racing drivers from Turin
Living people
People from La Chaux-de-Fonds
Swiss watchmakers (people)